Panagiotis Paiteris (born 14 July 1997) is a Greek professional footballer who plays as a goalkeeper for Trikala.

References

1997 births
Living people
Greek footballers
Greek expatriate footballers
Super League Greece players
Kategoria Superiore players
Gamma Ethniki players
Football League (Greece) players
Super League Greece 2 players
Apollon Larissa F.C. players
Athlitiki Enosi Larissa F.C. players
Luftëtari Gjirokastër players
Asteras Vlachioti F.C. players
Almopos Aridea F.C. players
Trikala F.C. players
Greek expatriate sportspeople in Albania
Expatriate footballers in Albania
Association football goalkeepers
Footballers from Larissa